Kateřina Kramperová (born 28 December 1988) is a Czech former tennis player.

Kramperová won five singles and eight doubles titles on the ITF Circuit. On 29 April 2013, she reached her best singles ranking of world No. 314. On 11 July 2016, she peaked at No. 208 in the WTA doubles rankings.

Partnering Bernarda Pera, Kramperová won her first $75k tournament in August 2015 at the Prague Open, defeating Miriam Kolodziejová and Markéta Vondroušová in the final.

In July 2019, Kramperová announced her retirement from professional tennis.

ITF Circuit finals

Singles: 17 (5 titles, 12 runner-ups)

Doubles: 28 (8 titles, 20 runner-ups)

External links
 
 

1988 births
Living people
Tennis players from Prague
Czech female tennis players